The 2015–2016 English Hockey League season took place from September 2015 until April 2016. The regular season consisted of two periods September until December and then February until March. The end of season playoffs known as the League Finals Weekend was held on the 16 & 17 of April.

Wimbledon won the Men's Premier League title despite finishing fourth in the regular season league standings. Surbiton won the Women's Premier League as well as finishing top of the regular season league standings.

The Men's Cup was won by Beeston and the Women's Cup was won by Clifton.

Men's Premier Division League Standings

Results

Women's Investec Premier Division League Standings

Results

League Finals Weekend

Semi-finals

Finals

Men's Cup

Quarter-finals

Semi-finals

Final
(Held at the Lee Valley Hockey & Tennis Centre on 14 February)

Women's Cup

Quarter-finals

Semi-finals

Final
(Held at Lee Valley Hockey & Tennis Centre on 30 April)

References

England Hockey League seasons
field hockey
field hockey
England